Igor Silva may refer to:

 Igor Silva (footballer) (born 1996), Brazilian footballer
 Igor Silva (cyclist) (born 1984), Angolan cyclist